Adémar de Chabannes (988/989 – 1034; also Adhémar de Chabannes) was a French/Frankish monk, active as a composer, scribe, historian, poet, grammarian and literary forger. He was associated with the Abbey of Saint Martial, Limoges, where he was a central figure in the Saint Martial school, an important center of early medieval music. Much of his career was spent copying and transcribing earlier accounts of Frankish history; his major work was the Chronicon Aquitanicum et Francicum (Chronicle of Aquitaine and France). He is well-known for forging a Vita, purportedly by Aurelian of Limoges, that indicated Saint Martial was one of the original apostles. Though he successfully convinced the local bishop and abbot of its authenticity, the traveling monk Benedict of Chiusa exposed his forgery and damaged Adémar's reputation.

Life and career
Besides perhaps Guillaume de Machaut, more is known about the life of Adémar than any other medieval composer. Part of this was from the well-recorded notoriety he would achieve from various infamous events, but also because the Abbey in which he worked preserved a huge amount of his literary and musical manuscripts. Unlike other documents there, the Adémar collection was later purchased by Louis XV, and thus spared from the substantial destruction of documents there during the French revolution.

Adémar was born at Chabannes, a village in today's Haute-Vienne département of France. Educated at the Abbey Saint-Martial de Limoges, he passed his life as a monk, both there and at the monastery of Saint-Cybard at Angoulême. Adémar died around 1034, most probably at Jerusalem, where he had gone on a pilgrimage.

Works

Music
Adémar composed his musical Mass and office according to the local school of his uncle Roger who worked as a cantor between 1010 until his death in 1025 at St. Martial Abbey using those modal patterns, as they have been documented in the tonaries of the new troper-prosers, chant books to which Adémar had partly contributed as a notator. Concerning the Apostolic feast of the patron he composed as well the hymns as the music which had become the metier of a cantor at Saint Martial. For this liturgical occasion which he had to create, he contributed like other cantors with own compositions, especially in the tropes (extended musical items added to existing liturgical texts).

Writings

When Adémar joined the Abbey Saint Martial of Limoges, he was educated by his uncle Roger de Chabannes, cantor of the Abbey between 1010 until his death in 1025. Adémar learned calligraphy, to read, to compose and to notate liturgical chant, to compile and to revise liturgical books, and to compose and to write liturgical poetry, homilies, chronicles and hagiography. His life was mainly spent in writing and transcribing chant books and chronicles, and his principal work is a history entitled Chronicon Aquitanicum et Francicum or Historia Francorum. This is in three books and deals with Frankish history from the reign of Pharamond, king of the Franks, to 1028. The first two books are scarcely more than a copy of earlier histories of Frankish kings, such as the Liber Historiae Francorum, the Continuation of Fredegar and the Annales regni Francorum. The third book, which deals with the period from 814 to 1028, is of considerable historical importance. It relies partly on the Chronicon Aquitanicum, to which Adémar himself added a final notice for the year 1028.

Forgery
He embraced the developing tale that Saint Martial, the third century bishop who Christianized the Limoges district, had actually lived centuries earlier, and was in fact one of the original apostles. And he supplemented the less than scanty documentation for the alleged 'apostolicity' of Martial, first with a forged Life of Martial, as if composed by Martial's successor, Bishop Aurelian. To effect this claim, he composed an "Apostolic Mass" that still exists in Adémar's own hand. The local bishop and abbot seem to have cooperated in the project and the mass was first sung on Sunday, 3 August 1029.

Unfortunately for Adémar, the liturgy was disrupted by a travelling monk, Benedict of Chiusa, who denounced the improved Vita of Martial as a provincial forgery and the new liturgy as offensive to God. The word spread, and the promising young monk was disgraced. Adémar's reaction was to build forgery upon forgery, inventing a Council of 1031 that confirmed the 'apostolic' status of Martial, even a forged papal letter. The reality of this pathological tissue of forgeries was only unravelled in the 1920s, by a historian, Louis Saltet. Mainstream Catholic historians ignored Saltet's revelations until the 1990s. 

In the long run, Adémar was successful. By the late 11th century, Martial was indeed venerated in Aquitaine as an apostle, though his legend was doubted elsewhere. In a very direct way, Adémar's Mass shows the power of liturgy to effect worship.

Legacy
According to James Grier, Professor of Music History in the Don Wright Faculty of Music at the University of Western Ontario, Adémar was the first person to write music using the musical notation still in use today. He placed the musical notes above the text, higher or lower according to the pitch. Professor Grier states that "Placement on the vertical axis remains the standard convention for indicating pitch in notation in Western culture and there is far greater weight on pitch than on many other elements such as dynamics and timbre". Therefore, in discovering this document written around 1000 years in the past, Professor Grier turns Adémar in one of the first—if not the first—to write music using "modern" notation.

Editions
Chronicon Aquitanicum et Francicum or Historia Francorum, ed. Jules Chavanon. Chronicon. Collection des textes pour servir à l'étude et à l'enseignement de l'histoire 20. Paris, 1897.
Sermons, ed. and tr. Edmond Pognon, L'an mille. Oeuvres de Liutprand, Raoul Glaber, Adémar de Chabannes, Adalberon [et] Helgaud. Mémoires du passé pour servir au temps présent 6. Paris, 1947.

References

Citations

Sources

Primary sources

Secondary sources

 
  
 
  
 Leyser, Karl. "The Ascent of Latin Europe." In Communications and Power in Medieval Europe. The Carolingian and Ottonian Centuries London, 1994. Inaugural lecture, first published as Karl Leyser, The Ascent of Latin Europe. Oxford, 1986.

Further reading

 
 
 
 
 
 Holland, Tom. Millennium. London: Abacus, 2009.
 James Grier, "Hoax, History, and Hagiography in Adémar de Chabannes's Texts for the Divine Office," in Robert A. Maxwell (ed), Representing History, 900–1300: Art, Music, History (University Park, PA, Pennsylvania State University press, 2010).

External links
 

980s births
1034 deaths
People from Haute-Vienne
11th-century French historians
French composers
French male composers
French Christian monks
Forgers
Tonaries
French male non-fiction writers
11th-century Latin writers
11th-century composers